"Love Is the Drug" is a 1975 song from English rock band Roxy Music's fifth studio album Siren, released as a single in September 1975. Co-written by Bryan Ferry and Andy Mackay, the song originated as a slower, dreamier track until the band transformed its arrangement to become more dance-friendly and uptempo. Ferry's lyrics recount a man going out looking for action.

The single was a commercial hit for the band, peaking at number two in the United Kingdom. It also gave the group its first substantial exposure in the United States, reaching number 30 in early 1976 on the US Billboard Hot 100. Since its release, the song has been hailed as an early influence on new wave and has been praised for its groove and bassline.

Background
Saxophonist Andy Mackay wrote the basic groove for the song in London in early 1975, explaining, "I came up with chords for an unusual song on my Wurlitzer electric piano. My chords had a distinctly English-y sound inspired by 20th century classical composers like Ralph Vaughan Williams. They had a folk-harmony feel influenced by early church music." The band then collaborated to flesh out the song in the studio, with vocalist Bryan Ferry and drummer Paul Thompson moving the song in a more dance-oriented style. Mackay recalled:

After hearing early versions of Mackay's chord progression, Ferry wrote the song's lyrics while at home in Holland Park. He stated, "The image I had in mind for the song was a young guy getting into his car and zooming off into town, looking for action at a club". He cited a Trinidadian friend named Christian for inspiring the song's opening lyrics: "He worked for Roxy doing wardrobe. Christian was a very amusing, laid-back guy. If there was ever a problem, Christian would say, 'T'ain't no big t'ing.' I liked the phrase, so my opening lyrics to the song were: 'T'ain't no big thing / to wait for the bell to ring / T'ain't no big thing / the toll of the bell.'

Saxaphonist Andy Mackay credited producer Chris Thomas with helping the band perfect the song. He recounted, "Chris had a huge impact particularly on 'Love Is The Drug'. His confidence and ability to make us work really hard and redo parts was exceptional. I spent literally hours tracking the sax riffs on 'Love Is The Drug' when they sounded pretty much OK to me. Chris was of course right."

Release
"Love Is the Drug" was the band's choice for the debut single from their 1975 album Siren: Mackay commented, "Like most hit singles, 'Love Is The Drug' kind of selected itself and always sounded like something special." The song was a commercial smash for the band, reaching number two in the UK and reaching the top twenty in the Netherlands, Belgium, and Australia. It also reached number 30 in the US, making it the band's highest charting single there. The band had struggled previously to make inroads in the US, with Mackay lamenting, "North America had been hard for us. We were seen there as an art-rock band."

Though the band did not film a music video for "Love Is the Drug", they did mime the song for a television appearance in 1975. Ferry wore an eye patch for the appearance, albeit not for aesthetic reasons. He recalled:

Critical reception and legacy
The song saw positive reception upon its release, with Cash Box writing that "city lyrics intertwined with the imagery of the dance floor make for a clever song" and that the "driving bass gets a hook on the listener."

Since then, "Love Is the Drug" has seen critical acclaim and many music writers point to the song as being a progenitor of future new wave and funk sounds. Dave Thompson of AllMusic concluded, "Indeed, peel away the radio-pleasing buoyancy which is the song's immediate calling card and 'Love Is the Drug' is as grimly unrelenting as any past Roxy attack -- as taut as it is tight, as sordid as it is sensual. Simple Minds, Gang of Four, Public Image Ltd., and the Human League can all trace at least a soupçon of their future funkiness to 'Love Is the Drug,' as can Roxy themselves." In 2019, Marc Myers of The Wall Street Journal characterized the song, with "its pulsating bass line and swaggering croon", as "the swaggering love song that launched new wave".

"Love Is the Drug" was selected as one of The Rock and Roll Hall of Fame's 500 Songs that Shaped Rock and Roll. Its bassline was included in the 2005 Stylus Magazine list of the "Top 50 Basslines of All Time" at number 26. The Quietus praised Gustafson's bassline as a "memorable groove". Nile Rodgers of Chic has since stated that the bassline was a major influence on his band Chic's song, "Good Times".

Charts

1Remix

Personnel 

 Bryan Ferry – vocals, keyboards
 Andy Mackay – saxophone
 Paul Thompson – drums
 Phil Manzanera – guitar
 Eddie Jobson – synthesizers, keyboards
 John Gustafson – bass

Grace Jones version

Grace Jones recorded "Love Is the Drug" for her Warm Leatherette album from 1980. The track was released as the second single, following "A Rolling Stone" in the UK while it was the first single to be released in Germany. After failing to chart in 1980, a remix of the Grace Jones version was released in 1986 following the 1985 compilation Island Life and then became a minor hit in the UK, peaking at No. 35. Music video was produced for the 1986 remix and directed by Matt Forrest and Bruno Tilley.

Ferry has since spoken positively of Jones' version, commenting, "I really liked Grace Jones's 'Love Is the Drug' cover, produced by the great Alex Sadkin – she gave it such attitude."

Track listing
7" single (1980)
A. "Love Is the Drug" – 4:40
B. "Sinning" – 4:10

12" single (1980)
A. "Love Is the Drug" – 8:40
B. "Sinning" – 4:10

12" single (1981)
A. "Love Is the Drug" – 7:15
B. "Demolition Man" – 4:04

UK 7" single (1986)
A. "Love Is the Drug" – 3:21
B. "Living My Life" – 5:28

EU 7" single (1986)
A. "Love Is the Drug" – 3:42
B. "Living My Life" – 3:58

12" single (1986)
A. "Love Is the Drug" – 6:57
B1. "Living My Life" – 5:28
B2. "The Apple Stretching" – 6:55

Chart performance

References

1975 songs
1975 singles
1980 singles
Roxy Music songs
Divinyls songs
Grace Jones songs
Songs written by Bryan Ferry
Songs written by Andy Mackay
Song recordings produced by Chris Thomas (record producer)
E.G. Records singles
Island Records singles
Progressive pop songs
Funk songs